Anna Vinnitskaya (born 4 August 1983, in Novorossiysk) is a Russian pianist who won the 2007 Queen Elisabeth Music Competition.

Biography
Anna Vinnitskaya was born in Novorossiysk. She displayed musical talent from an early age, following her first piano lessons at age 6. From 1995 to 2001, she studied at the Rachmaninoff Conservatory in Rostov-on-Don with Sergei Ossipenko, after which she was admitted to the Hochschule für Musik und Theater in Hamburg, where she studied with Evgeni Koroliov. As a soloist, she has played with major orchestras, including the Moscow Symphony Orchestra, the Dortmunder Philharmoniker, the Berliner Philharmoniker, the Sinfonieorchester Basel, the Milan Symphony Orchestra and the Orquesta Sinfonica de Madrid, and has given recitals all around Europe.

She entered the competition circuit at age 13, winning first prize at the International Junoshenki competition. In 2000 she achieved a third place at the Monza Competition and two years later first place at the Jaèn Competition, where she also won the Audience Award. This was followed with a first prize at the Elise Meyer Competition in Hamburg in 2004, and the fourth prize in the Ferruccio Busoni International Competition in Bolzano in 2005.

On 2 June 2007, she won first prize in the Queen Elisabeth Music Competition in Brussels. After a memorable Gaspard de la nuit (Ravel) in the first rounds, she impressed the audience and jury in the final round with Beethoven's Sonata No.13 in E flat "Quasi una fantasia", Op. 27 No.1; the compulsory work La Luna y la Muerte by Miguel Gálvez-Taroncher; and the Piano Concerto No.2 by Sergei Prokofiev. Vinnitskaya was only the second woman in the history of the competition for piano to win the first prize, after Ekaterina Novitskaya in 1968.

Anna Vinnitskaya was appointed professor of piano at her alma mater at the Hochschule für Musik und Theater, Hamburg, in 2009.

Prizes
International Junoshenki competition – First prize (1995)
Monza Competition – Third prize (2000)
Jaèn Competition – First prize/Audience Award (2002)
Elise Meyer Competition (Hamburg) – First prize (2004)
International Ferruccio Busoni Competition (Bolzano) – Fourth prize (2005)
Queen Elisabeth Music Competition for Piano (Brussels) – First prize (2007)

References

External links
Anna Vinnitskaya's North and South American Management Schmidt Artists

Russian classical pianists
Russian women pianists
1983 births
Living people
Prize-winners of the Queen Elisabeth Competition
Prize-winners of the Ferruccio Busoni International Piano Competition
Women classical pianists
21st-century classical pianists
21st-century women pianists